Otabek Shamuradov (born 21 July 1974) is an Uzbekistan football midfielder who played for Uzbekistan in the 2000 Asian Cup. He also played for Neftchi Fergana.

External links

Otabek Shamuradov - 11v11

1974 births
Living people
People from Fergana
Uzbekistani footballers
Association football midfielders
Surkhon Termez players
FK Neftchi Farg'ona players
FC Sogdiana Jizzakh players
FK Dinamo Samarqand players
Uzbekistan international footballers
2000 AFC Asian Cup players